The Best American Short Stories 1991, a volume in The Best American Short Stories series, was edited by Katrina Kenison and by guest editor Alice Adams.

Short stories included

References

External links
 Best American Short Stories

1991 anthologies
Fiction anthologies
Short Stories 1991
Houghton Mifflin books